Sylvia Brooks is an American jazz singer and songwriter.

Sylvia Brooks started her career in classical theatre, having studied at The American Conservatory Theater under the direction of Allen Fletcher and Bill Ball.

In 2009, Brooks began singing jazz and collaborated with Thomas Garvin, who wrote the arrangements for her debut album Dangerous Liaisons. Brooks made her performing debut as a jazz singer at the Jazz Bakery in Los Angeles.

In 2012, Brooks released her second album, Restless, which introduced what she calls "jazz noir".

In 2017, Brooks released The Arrangement . She collaborated with Kim Richmond, Jeff Colella, Christian Jacob, Quinn Johnson, and Otmaro Ruiz. The Arrangement also began her journey into songwriting with three original songs co-written by Christian Jacob, Patrick Williams and Quinn Johnson. 
 
On May 30, 2022, Brooks released her 4th album Signature on Rhombus Records. It features seven original pieces with collaborators Tom Ranier, Christian Jacob and Jeff Colella. C. Michael Bailey, in his review of the album, called Brooks a "master stylist".

Early life 

Born in Miami Beach, Florida, Sylvia Brooks was born Sylvia Victoria Ippolito.

Her father, Don Ippolito, was a jazz pianist who has played with various other icons such as Ira Sullivan, Buddy Rich, Peggy Lee, and Dizzie Gillespie, and her mother, Johanna Dordick, was an opera singer who founded the Los Angeles Opera Theatre. After her studies, she moved to New York, and started working in the theatre. It was a fall after returning from playing Anita in West Side Story that ended her career in New York. She relocated to Los Angeles and began working in Episodic Television, but when her father died, while going through his archives, she realized she wanted to return to her roots in Jazz.

References

External links

Living people
American jazz singers
American women jazz singers
Year of birth missing (living people)
People from Miami Beach, Florida
21st-century American women